La Hague is a commune in the department of Manche, northwestern France. The municipality was established on 1 January 2017 by merger of the former communes of Beaumont-Hague (the seat), Acqueville, Auderville, Biville, Branville-Hague, Digulleville, Éculleville, Flottemanville-Hague, Gréville-Hague, Herqueville, Jobourg, Omonville-la-Petite, Omonville-la-Rogue, Sainte-Croix-Hague, Saint-Germain-des-Vaux, Tonneville, Urville-Nacqueville, Vasteville and Vauville.

Population

See also 
Communes of the Manche department

References 

Hague